Rémoulade is a cold sauce. Although similar to tartar sauce, it is often more yellowish, sometimes flavored with curry, and often contains chopped pickles or piccalilli. It can also contain horseradish, paprika, anchovies, capers and a host of other items. 

While its original purpose was possibly for serving with meats, it is now more often used as a condiment or dipping sauce, primarily for sole, plaice, and seafood cakes (such as crab or salmon cakes).

Use 
Rémoulade is originally from France, and can now be found throughout Europe and in the United States, specifically in Louisiana Creole cuisine. It is often used with French fries, on top of roast beef items, and as a hot dog condiment, although there are many other applications around the world.

France
Rémoulade is made from mayonnaise with vinegar, mustard, shallots, capers, chopped pickles, and/or fresh herbs (chives, tarragon, chervil, burnet). It is commonly used in a dish called céleri rémoulade, which consists of thinly cut pieces of celeriac with a mustard-flavored remoulade, and also to accompany red meats, fish, and shellfish.

Belgium 
Used often with fries, such as those sold at roadside stands.

Denmark 
An essential ingredient on open-face roast beef sandwiches (smørrebrød), as well as the Danish version of fish and chips, fried plaice with fries. 

It is also one of the essential condiments in a Danish hot dog. Danish remoulade is a modified version of the original French-style remoulade. It is a mayonnaise-based sauce, coloured brightly yellow with turmeric (or a pinch of curry powder), mixed with a purée of capers and pickled gherkins or cucumbers, and sometimes cauliflower, cabbage and carrots.

Netherlands
Often served with fried fish.

Germany
Mainly used with fried fish, and as an ingredient of potato salads, or as a boiled egg garnish (similar to deviled eggs). In the southern half of the country it is served with boiled beef and potatoes.

Sweden
Remouladsås or remoulade is a common condiment for fried or breaded fish dishes, also used as a topping on roast beef. 

The Danish version is also available and is used on a variety of dishes referred to as 'Danish-style', for example Danish hot dogs and Danish smørrebrød.

Norway
Primarily served with deep-fried fish, on aspic, or on open-faced sandwiches.

Poland
Called remulada, or rarely sos duński (Danish sauce), it is a very popular condiment for fast food, such as hot dogs, hamburgers, or zapiekanka.

Iceland
Remúlaði is a condiment commonly served with fried fish and on hot dogs, together with mustard, ketchup, and raw and fried onions.

United States
Typically served as a condiment with seafood and certain vegetables. Fried soft-shell crab sandwiches may be served with remoulade as the only sauce. 

It is also very commonly used as a condiment for sandwiches, especially turkey. Remoulade is most commonly paired with white cheese. It may be offered as a fry sauce as well.

In Louisiana Creole cuisine, remoulade tends to have a tannish or pink tint due to the use of Creole brown mustard like Zatarain's, small amounts of ketchup, cayenne pepper, and paprika.

Varieties

Sauce rémoulade
In French cuisine, rémoulade is a derivative of the mayonnaise sauce, with the addition of mixed herbs (parsley, chives, chervil and tarragon), capers, diced cornichons and optionally some anchovy essence or chopped anchovies.

The rémoulade used in céleri-rave rémoulade is different: it is based on a simple mustard-flavoured vinegar and oil dressing spiced with salt, pepper, and chopped green herbs.

Danish remoulade

Danish remoulade has a mild, sweet-sour taste and a medium yellow color. The typical industrially-made variety does not contain capers, but finely-chopped cabbage and pickled cucumber, fair amounts of sugar, and a touch of curry powder (mustard seeds, cayenne pepper, coriander, onion powder, and turmeric) mostly for color. The fresh herbs are replaced by herbal essences, e.g., tarragon vinegar. Starch, gelatin or milk protein may be added as thickeners.

Homemade or gourmet varieties may use olive oil (especially good with fish), capers, pickles, carrots, cucumber, lemon juice, dill, chervil, parsley or other fresh herbs, and possibly curry powder of various contents.

In Denmark, remoulade is mostly used for french fries, hotdogs and for open sandwiches with roast beef, salami, fish cakes or fried fish.

Louisiana remoulade

Louisiana remoulade can vary from the French-African Creole, the rustic Afro-Caribbean Creole, or the Classic Cajun version, and like the local variants of roux, each version is different from the French original.

Creole versions often have tan or pink hues and are usually piquant. 

Louisiana-style remoulades fall generally into one of two categories—those with a mayonnaise base and those with an oil base, but sometimes both mayonnaise and oil are used. 

Each version may have finely chopped vegetables, usually green onions and celery, and parsley; most are made with either Creole or stone-ground mustard. Salt, black pepper, and cayenne pepper are also standard ingredients. 

In the oil- and mayonnaise-based versions, the reddish hue often comes from the addition of a small amount of ketchup and/or paprika. 

The sauce is often topped with paprika for the aesthetics as well as the flavor. Generally, lemon juice or vinegar are added for acidity. Other additions include hardboiled egg or raw egg yolks, minced garlic, hot sauce, vinegar, horseradish, capers, cornichons, and Worcestershire sauce.

While the classic white remoulade is a condiment that can be offered in a variety of contexts (e.g., the classic celery root remoulade), Creole remoulade is used on shrimp, crabs, fried calamari, artichokes, and fried green tomatoes among other foods. 

Today, shrimp remoulade is a very common cold appetizer in New Orleans Creole restaurants, although, historically, hard boiled eggs with remoulade was a less expensive option on some menus. 

Shrimp remoulade is most often served as a stand-alone appetizer (usually on a chiffonade of iceberg lettuce). One might also see crawfish remoulade, but restaurants seldom offer remoulade sauce as an accompaniment with fish, where cocktail sauce and tartar sauce are generally preferred. However, food columnist and cookbook author Leon Soniat does suggest to "Serve [remoulade] over seafood or with sliced asparagus."

Central Mississippi has comeback sauce, a condiment that is very similar to Louisiana remoulade.

See also

 Cuisine of Denmark
 Cuisine of France
 Russian Dressing
 List of dips
 List of sauces
 Thousand Island Dressing
 Louisiana Creole cuisine

Notes

References
 dictionary.reference.com
 Tulane University Newcomb College Center for Research on Women Deep South Culinary Oral History Project
 lib.k-state.edu , This page contains images of what may be the first recipe of remoulade in print from the 1817 edition of Le Cuisinier Royal.]

Danish cuisine
French cuisine
Occitan cuisine
Louisiana cuisine
Cuisine of New Orleans
Sauces
Mayonnaise
German cuisine